Hesperocnide is a small genus of nettles containing two species. These are annual herbs covered in stinging hairs and toothed leaves.

Hesperocnide sandwicensis, the Hawaii nettle, is endemic to Hawaii. Hesperocnide tenella, the western nettle, is native to California and Baja California.

References

External links 
 Jepson Manual Treatment

Urticaceae
Urticaceae genera